The 2008–09 Dongbu Promy Professional Basketball season was the 13th season of the Korean Basketball League.

Regular season

Playoffs

Prize money
Jeonju KCC Egis: KRW 130,000,000 (champions + regular-season 3rd place)
Ulsan Mobis Phoebus: KRW 100,000,000 (regular-season 1st place)
Seoul Samsung Thunders: KRW 50,000,000 (runners-up)
Wonju Dongbu Promy: KRW 50,000,000 (regular-season 2nd place)

External links
Official KBL website (Korean & English)

2008–09
2008–09 in South Korean basketball
2008–09 in Asian basketball leagues